Edward is an English given name.

Edward may also refer to:
 Edward (ballad), a traditional murder ballad
 Edward (EP), by British singer-songwriter Emmy the Great
 Edward (mango), a mango cultivar
 Lake Edward, the smallest of the Great Lakes of Africa
 Rural Municipality of Edward, Manitoba, Canada

Other 
 Edward River (disambiguation)
 Edward Gaming

See also 
 Edwards (disambiguation)